Sylvester "Joe" Stephens (born 1934/1935) is an American politician who served as the second African-American mayor of Saginaw, Michigan.

Biography
Known as "Joe", Sylvester Stephens joined the Saginaw Police Force in 1957 and served during the 1967 Saginaw riot when the city had its first African-American mayor, Henry G. Marsh.

Political career 
In 1973, he was elected to the Saginaw City Council and was named Mayor on November 14, 1977. Saginaw has a weak mayor form of government where the mayor does not have the power to hire and fire employees or issue a veto. During his term, he was able to fully integrate the police force, developed a citizen participation framework where the councilors would hold fact-finding meetings at the city's 25 schools, implemented a city income tax (which was capped in 1979), tore down vacant buildings, and secured federal funding for urban development although he was unable to stem the flow of people to the suburbs. He served his term as mayor until November 12, 1979. The city council was unable to decide on his replacement until  December 10, 1979, when Paul P. Prudhomme was chosen. He served as city councilor until 1985.

Post-political career 
He served as president of the Michigan Municipal League from 1984 to 1985. Stephens later went on to serve as an executive at General Motors.

References

1930s births
Living people
Mayors of places in Michigan
Michigan Democrats
People from Saginaw, Michigan
African-American mayors in Michigan
Mayors of Saginaw, Michigan
21st-century African-American people
20th-century African-American people